Kirsten Aschengreen Piacenti (29 March 1929 – 9 April 2021) was a Danish art historian and museum director.

Piacenti studied at the Courtauld Institute of Art, where she graduated with a bachelor's degree in 1951, and a master's degree in 1953, and eventually graduated with a doctor degree from the University of Florence in 1966. She was assigned with Museo degli Argenti at Palazzo Pitti in Florence from 1971. From 1996 she was appointed director of the Stibbert Museum in Florence.

She was decorated Knight of the Order of Dannebrog in 1995, and Lieutenant of the Royal Victorian Order in 2010.

Piacenti died on 9 April 2021.

Selected works

References

1929 births
2021 deaths
Danish art historians
Directors of museums in Italy
Women museum directors
University of Florence alumni
Danish expatriates in Italy
Knights of the Order of the Dannebrog
Lieutenants of the Royal Victorian Order